The Royal Air Force Football Association, also known as the RAF FA, is the governing body of football within the Royal Air Force.

See also
Army Football Association
Royal Marines Football Association
Royal Navy Football Association

References

External links

County football associations
Football in Oxfordshire
Sports organizations established in 1920
Football
Military association football
Military sports governing bodies in the United Kingdom
Carterton, Oxfordshire